Robert Henry Burke  (July 16, 1922 – September 26, 2003) was an American politician in California.

Early life and education
Born in Des Moines, Iowa, Burke served in the United States Army Air Forces during World War II and was a pilot. He enlisted in the United States Army on February 1, 1943, and served until July 30, 1946. He received his bachelor's degree from University of California, Berkeley in engineering.

Career
In 1963, Burke moved to Huntington Beach, California and worked for Signal Oil and Gas Company. Burke served on the Huntington Beach School District Board from 1964 to 1966. Burke served in the California State Assembly from 1966 to 1976 and was a Republican.

Later life
Burke lived in Kihei, Hawaii. He died at Maui Memorial Hospital in Wailuku, Hawaii.

References

External links

Join California Robert H. Burke

1922 births
2003 deaths
United States Army Air Forces officers
School board members in California
Republican Party members of the California State Assembly
Military personnel from Iowa
Politicians from Des Moines, Iowa
People from Huntington Beach, California
UC Berkeley College of Engineering alumni
United States Army Air Forces pilots of World War II
20th-century American politicians
Military personnel from California